Mohsen Eslamzadeh is an Iranian documentary filmmaker. He is the director of Alone Among The Taliban. This film has won the best documentary award at the 44th Athens International Film and Video Festival in the United States. 
This film has won the best documentary award at the 12th Marbella International Film Festival in Spain. 
This film has won the Shahid Avini Award offers.

Filmography
“The Sunnies of Iran”
 “Mothers of the Revolution”
 “Mysteries of Abu-Salim Prison”
 “In the name of Liberty” 
 “Looking for Peace”
 “Alone Among The Taliban”
 The Dream of Marjaan

Awards and honors
 The competition of the international festival of documentary films "Meetings in Siberia" | Russia, 2018
 The competition of the "Tiburon International Film Festival" | USA, 2017
 The best documentary of “Athen international film + video festival” | USA, 2017

 The best documentary of “Marbella international film festival” | Spain, 2017

 The “Moscow detective film festival” | Russia, 2017
 The competition of the “Thin line film festival” | USA, 2017

 The competition of the “Asia-Pacific Film Festival” | 2016
 The competition of the “Human rights film festival” | Italy, 2017

 The competition of the “Ismailia international film festival” | Egypt, 2017

 The winner of the “Shahid Avini” international section of the “Cinema Verite” | Iran, 2015
 The winner of the “Ammar popular film festival” | Iran, 2015
 The 8th “Ammar film festival” for The Documentary of “Qasr-e-Qand” | Iran, 2018
 The 7th “Ammar film festival” for The TV show of “Vatandar” | Iran, 2017
 The winner of the 5th Ammar festival for the film "Sunnis in Iran"
 The winner of the international section of the forth Ammar festival for the film "Journey to the Land of Pashtuns"
 The winner of the special section of “Ruyesh” (growth) festival for the film “Mother of the Revolution”
 The winner of the international section of the third Ammar festival for the film “ the Thought of Being”
 The honored young documentary director from Mashhad in 2010 chosen by Mashhad's Islamic Revolution Cultural Centre.
 The honored in the “Awakening Sequence” for the film “the Lover”
 The honored in the first Ammar film Festival for the film “the Street of Martyrdom”

He is a former guest of the many film festivals such as:
 The “Nahj film festival” for The documentary of “Me and the commander” | Iraq, 2016
 The Festival as a guest speaker “Aljazeera film festival” for the film “Mysteries of Abusalim Prison” | Qatar, 2013
 The “Resistance international film festival” for the film of “Al-Sheikh Sabah” | Iran, 2015

Eslamzadeh participated in few film festivals such as: “Fajr”, “Cinema Verity” and “Rooyesh” in Iran.
Eslamzadeh has won numerous awards and fellowships including “Aljazeera” in Qatar and “Human Rights” in Spain and he awarded in some of them.

References

External links
Iranian Documentary on Taliban to Be Screened at Italy’s Sole Luna Festival 
Festival dei Diritti Umani 2017 a Milano: il programma

Iranian film directors
Living people
Iranian documentary filmmakers
People from Mashhad
1980 births